Gerardo de Jesús "Jerry" Velázquez Molina (born March 30, 1990) is a Mexican actor and musician.

Career and personal life 
He was born on March 30, 1990, in Mérida, Yucatán. His first approaches to music and theater were at festivals and school musicals. In 2007 he participated in High School Musical, La Selección talent contest by TV Azteca and Disney Channel, where he was a finalist. He participated in the recording of 2 albums distributed by Sony BMG, the supporting tour and the film High School Musical: el desafío. Subsequently, in such musicals as A Midsummer's Night Dream and Hairspray. He also dubbed in cartoons as Teenage Mutant Ninja Turtles, Pokémon, Phineas and Ferb, among others. He starred in the series Cuando toca la campana for Disney Channel Latin America playing "DJ".

Velázquez is gay.

Filmography

Film

Televisión

Singles

References

External links 
 Jerry Velázquez on YouTube
 Jerry Velázquez on Twitter

1990 births
Living people
Male actors from Yucatán (state)
Mexican male child actors
Mexican male film actors
Mexican male television actors
Mexican male voice actors
Mexican pop singers
Musicians from Yucatán (state)
21st-century Mexican male singers
Mexican gay actors
Mexican gay musicians
Mexican LGBT singers
Gay singers